The People Win Through is a 1954 Burmese black-and-white political-drama film, directed by Jobisite Jr. starring Bo Ba Ko, Maung Maung Ta, Hla Maung Lay, Htar Htar and Kyin Hla. It was based on the popular play The People Win Through, written by U Nu.

Cast
Bo Ba Ko as Aung Win
Maung Maung Ta as Aye Maung
Hla Maung Lay as Bo Tauk Htun
Khin Maung Zaw as Mya Gyi
Kyaw Thaung as U Thar Doon
Ba Zin as U Ba Thein
Thukha as U Bo Sate
Jolly Swe as Hla Thaung
Htar Htar as Khin Nwet
Kyin Hla as Aye Tin

References

1954 films
1950s Burmese-language films
Films shot in Myanmar
Burmese black-and-white films
Burmese drama films
1954 drama films